The Mighty Diamonds were a Jamaican harmony trio, recording roots reggae with a strong Rastafarian influence. The group was formed in 1969 and were best known for their 1976 debut album, Right Time, produced by Joseph Hoo Kim, and the 1979 release, Deeper Roots.

On March 29, 2022, their lead singer, Donald "Tabby" Shaw, was shot dead in a drive-by shooting. On April 1, 2022, Fitzroy "Bunny" Simpson died.

History
Formed in 1969 in the Trenchtown area of Kingston, the group comprised lead vocalist Donald "Tabby" Shaw, and harmony vocalists Fitzroy "Bunny" Simpson and Lloyd "Judge" Ferguson. They had become friends at school in the mid-1960s, and were originally called The Limelight, adopting 'Mighty Diamonds' after Shaw's mother started referring to them as "the diamonds". Their smooth harmonies and choreographed stage show were inspired by Motown vocal groups of the 1960s, with Shaw listing The Temptations, The Stylistics, The Impressions, and The Delfonics as influences as well as Jamaican rocksteady artists such as John Holt and Ken Boothe.

Their early recordings were produced by Pat Francis, Stranger Cole ("Girl You Are Too Young" (1970), "Oh No Baby"), Derrick Harriott ("Mash Up"), Bunny Lee ("Jah Jah Bless the Dreadlocks", "Carefree Girl"), Lee "Scratch" Perry ("Talk About It"), and Rupie Edwards, but it was in 1973 that they had their first hit single with the Francis-produced "Shame and Pride", recorded at the Dynamic Sounds studio. It was their mid-1970s work with producer Joseph Hoo Kim that gave them their real breakthrough. "Country Living" and "Hey Girl" were recorded and released by the Channel One label. "Right Time" followed, on Hoo Kim's Well Charge label, and cemented their status as one of the top Jamaican groups of the time.

Virgin Records signed them and the group's début album, Right Time, was released in 1976, including most of their early Channel One hits. The album was an international success and for the follow-up, Virgin sent them to work with Allen Toussaint in New Orleans, with local musicians providing the backing. The resulting Ice on Fire album sold poorly, the production not appealing to reggae fans, and the album later described as "an attempt by New Orleans soul musicians to play reggae".

Back in Jamaica, they continued to record for Channel One, with the Stand Up to Your Judgment album released in 1978, and continued to produce a string of hit singles. They also released records on their own 'Bad Gong' label. The group's Deeper Roots, released in 1979, was their next big album success, again released by Virgin, on its Front Line label.

In the early 1980s, they recorded with producer Gussie Clarke, largely using old Studio One tracks as the basis for their recordings, and dubplates of these sessions became popular on sound systems in Jamaica, New York, and London, particularly "Pass the Kouchie", recorded on the "Full Up" riddim. Their work with Clarke produced the 1981 album Changes.

"Pass the Kouchie", written by Ferguson and Simpson, became an international hit twice, when first released (on their 1982 album Changes) and again when it was covered by Musical Youth with altered lyric to remove the drug references, and released as "Pass the Dutchie" (1982).

Their performance at Reggae Sunsplash in 1982 was released on an album later that year, paired with the performance from Mutabaruka.

The group continued to release albums regularly, adapting successfully to the prevailing digital rhythms of the 1980s and beyond. Tabby, Bunny and Judge issued over forty albums in their long career.

In 2021, the group was honoured with the Order of Distinction (Officer Class) in the National Honours and Awards, on the occasion of Jamaica’s 59th Anniversary of Independence.

Discography

Studio albums
 Right Time (1976), Well Charge/Virgin – also issued under the title When the Right Time Come (I Need a Roof)
 Ice on Fire (1977), Virgin
 Planet Mars Dub (1978), Front Line – The Icebreakers and the Diamonds, dub version of Planet Earth
 Stand Up to Your Judgment (1978), Channel One
 Tell Me What's Wrong (1978), Hit Bound
 Planet Earth (1978), Virgin
 Deeper Roots (1979), Front Line
 Deeper Roots Dub (1979)
 Changes (1981), Music Works
 Dubwise (1981), Music Works – six dub versions from Changes and four other dubs
 Reggae Street (1981), Shanachie
 The Roots Is There (1982), Music Works/Shanachie
 Indestructible (1982), Alligator  (similar to the album Changes with two extra songs)
 Heads of Government (1982), Jah Guidance
 Leaders of Black Countries (Showcase Album) (1983), Mobiliser
 Backstage (1983), Music Works
 Kouchie Vibes (1984), Burning Sounds
 Diamonds Are Forever (1984), Woorell Japan – Eight songs exclusive to Japan plus two singles
 Pass the Kouchie (1985), Bad Gong – singles issued on Bad Gong records in the early 1980s plus new material
 Struggling (1985), Live & Learn
 If You Looking for Trouble (1986), Live & Learn
 The Real Enemy (1987), Greensleeves
 Never Get Weary (1988), Live & Learn
 Get Ready (1988), Rohit International/Greensleeves
 Ready for the World (1989), Overheat Japan – Eight songs exclusive to Japan plus two singles
 Jam Session (1990), Live & Learn
 Tour the World (1991) – contains five new songs and five old songs
 Patience (1991), Tassa
 The Moment of Truth (1992), Mango
 Bust Out (1993), Greensleeves/VP
 Paint It Red (1993), RAS
 Speak the Truth (1994), RAS
 Stand Up (1998), Gone Clear
 Rise Up  (2001), Charm
 Thugs in the Streets (2006), Nocturne
 Inna De Yard (2008), Makasound – acoustic versions of classic songs performed with nyabinghi drums

Collaborations and split albums
 Vital Dub Strictly Rockers (aka: Vital Dub – Well Charged) (1976) – includes five dub versions from the Right Time album
 Trinity Meet the Mighty Diamonds (1979), Gorgon
 Disco Showcase (1979), Gussie Roots Sounds – Leroy Smart feat. The Mighty Diamonds
 Right Time Rockers (The Lost Album) (1998) – recorded in 1976, U-Roy deejaying on the riddims from the Right Time album

Compilations
 Vital Selection (1981), Virgin – 1976–1979 Joseph Hoo Kim produced material
 Ebony and Ivory (1983), Woorell – Japanese compilation of Augustus Clark productions
 Go Seek Your Rights (1990), Front Line – 1976–1979 Joseph Hoo Kim produced material
 Mighty Diamonds Meet Don Carlos & Gold at Channel One Studios (1993), Channel One – includes the complete Right Time album
 Paint It Red (1993), RAS – compilation of singles from 1985–1990, overdubbed with new instruments
 Works (1994), JVC/Victor – 1981–1988 Augustus Clarke material
 From the Foundation (1996), Gone Clear – The Mighty Diamonds & The Tamlins, 1978–1981 Augustus Clarke material
 Heads of Government (1996), Germain – Donovan Germain-produced material, different from the 1983 album
 Maximum Replay (1997) – 1981–1988 Augustus Clarke material
 The Best of the Mighty Diamonds: 20 Hits (1997) – contains two full albums: Stand Up to Your Judgment and Tell Me What's Wrong
 RAS Portrait (1997), RAS – recordings from 1993–1994
 Right Time Come (1998) – includes the complete Right Time album and nine songs from 1978
 Indestructible: Anthology Volume 1 (1999)
 Natural Natty Reggae (2000), Simon – compilation of singles produced by Bunny Diamonds between 1976 and 1997
 The Classics Recordings of Jamaica's Finest Vocal Trio (2000), Music Club
 Gold Collection (2000), Grayland
 Everlasting: 30th Anniversary (2000), D-3
 Rise Up (2001), Jet Star
 Unconquerable (2003), Reggae Road
 Revolution (2003), NYC Music
 The Best of the Mighty Diamonds (2004), Seymour – features two albums: Pass the Kouchie and Tour the World
 Back2Back: Tamlins & Mighty Diamonds (2007)
 Reggae Legends (2008), VP – 4-CD boxset that contains the four albums issued on Greensleeves: The Real Enemy, Get Ready, Live in Europe and Bust Out
 Kings of Reggae (2009), Nocturne – material issued on RAS records in 1993–1994
 Leaders of Black Countries (2011), Kingston Sounds

Live albums
 Live in Tokyo (1985)
 Live in Europe (1989)
 Live at Reggae Sunsplash (1992), Genes  – recorded in August 1982, eight songs from Mighty Diamonds and seven songs from Mutabaruka
 The Best of Reggae Live (2001) – Frankie Paul & Mighty Diamonds
 Live in Europe: Nice, France (2002) – recorded in 1997

References

External links
Detailed discography on NiceUp.com
Mighty Diamonds discography – singles and more
Discography at Discogs

Jamaican reggae musical groups
Musical groups established in 1969
Musical groups disestablished in 2022
VP Records artists
Shanachie Records artists
Virgin Records artists
1969 establishments in Jamaica
2022 disestablishments in Jamaica